From 1995 to 1999, the number of animated series with LGBTQ characters dramatically increased the number of series which featured such characters during the earlier part of the decade, from 1990 to 1994. Prominently, anime such as Revolutionary Girl Utena, Cardcaptor Sakura, and One Piece featured LGBTQ characters. Animated series South Park and Family Guy did the same, compromising the majority of LGBTQ characters in Western animated series at the time.

This list only includes recurring characters, otherwise known as supporting characters, which appear frequently from time to time during the series' run, often playing major roles in more than one episode, and those in the main cast are listed below. LGBTQ characters which are guest stars or one-off characters are listed on the pages focusing exclusively on gay (in animation and anime), lesbian (in animation and anime), bisexual (in animation and anime), trans, pansexual, asexual, non-binary, and intersex characters.

For a further understanding of how these LGBTQ characters fit into the overall history of animation, see the History of LGBT characters in animated series: 1990s page.

The entries on this page are organized alphanumerically by duration dates and then alphabetically by the first letter of a specific series.

1995

1996

1997

1998

1999

See also

 List of yuri anime and manga
 List of LGBT-related films by year
 List of animated films with LGBT characters

References

Citations

Sources
 
  
 

1990s animated television series
1990s-related lists
Animated
Lists of animated series